The EMD F40C is a 6-axle  diesel-electric locomotive built by General Motors Electro-Motive Division in 1974 for commuter service in Chicago. EMD only built 15 locomotives; the decline of the 6-axle design for passenger service led to the adoption of the 4-axle EMD F40PH as the standard passenger locomotive in the United States. Along with a small fleet of HEP-equipped EMD SD70MAC locomotives operating on the Alaska Railroad, the F40Cs were the last six-axle passenger locomotives in daily service in North America until the delivery of Metra's first SD70MACH in 2022.

As of March 2022, all but two F40Cs have been retired, though none are operating. They were replaced by the MPI MP36PH-3S in 2003–2004. Locomotives #600-#609 and #613 were the first to be retired in 2003 and had their road numbers unregistered with the Federal Railroad Administration. They were all retired before 2007. #610 was unregistered in 2004 and was sent to National Railway Equipment in Dixmoor, Illinois. It was scrapped on September 24, 2020. The only F40Cs that remain are #611 and 614. Both locomotives are currently stored in Metra's Western Avenue rail yard.

Design
The F40C is derived from the EMD SDP40F; besides the shorter length, the primary difference between the two is the substitution of a  HEP generator for the SDP40F's twin steam generators. It is powered by a 16 cylinder EMD 645E3B, producing .

History
In the early 1970s the Milwaukee Road operated two commuter rail lines in Chicago:  the Milwaukee District / North Line to Fox Lake via the Canadian Pacific's C&M Subdivision, and the Milwaukee District / West Line to Elgin via the CP's Elgin Subdivision. The operation of these lines was subsidized by local transit agencies. In 1974 two local agencies, the North West Suburban Mass Transit District and the North Suburban Mass Transit District funded the acquisition of 15 F40Cs for use on the Milwaukee lines. The locomotives passed to Metra on the latter's creation in the 1980s but continued to operate on the ex-Milwaukee lines.

The F40C was withdrawn from regular service with the arrival of new MPI MP36PH-3S locomotives in 2003–2004. Twelve were sold to locomotive leasing corporations Helm Leasing and one to National Railway Equipment. The remaining two, 611 and 614, were retained and stored at Western Avenue railyard. Both were reactivated in January 2005 after problems with the MPI MP36PH-3Ss. In 2005 Kansas City Southern signed a contract with Helm Leasing to use 12 for nine months.

In the spring of 2009, 611 and 614 were returned to revenue service on both of Metra's ex-Milwaukee Road commuter lines. This was done while the oldest units in Metra's EMD F40PH fleet were being rebuilt. Towards the end of 2016, with many F40PH-2 and F40PHM-2 locomotives being sent out for rebuild, there was an increased likelihood that the 611 and the 614 will be put back into service.

Currently, #611 and #614 are retained to fill the roles of locomotives that have broken down or are being rebuilt. Despite this, neither locomotive has seen regular service since 2012. Metra at one time did have plans to rebuild both F40Cs to test new prime movers and control packages, but due to a lack of bidders, this plan has been put on hold indefinitely.

Notes

References

 
 
 

C-C locomotives
F40C
Metra
Milwaukee Road locomotives
Passenger locomotives
Diesel-electric locomotives of the United States
Railway locomotives introduced in 1974
Standard gauge locomotives of the United States